Ayatollah Mostafa Boroujerdi(Persian: مصطفی بروجردی) (born 1962) is an Iranian Twelver Shi'a.

He studied in the seminaries of Qom, Iran under the Grand Ayatollah Mohammad Fazel Lankarani and Mohammad Mahdi Bojnourdi.

See also
List of Ayatollahs
List of Maraji

References

External links

:fa:مصطفی بروجردی

Iranian ayatollahs
1962 births
Living people